Hapsifera is a genus of moths belonging to the family  Tineidae.

References

Tineidae
Tineidae genera